Maon may refer to:
Preon, theoretical component of quarks
Ma'on, Har Hebron, a Jewish settlement in the West Bank
 Tell Maon, ancient biblical city in Judea, now a ruin
Maon, a city and a wilderness in Judah, mentioned in the Hebrew Bible
Maon (bug), a planthopper in the Eurybrachidae family
Horvat Maon, archaeological site located 20 kilometres (12 mi) southwest of Gaza
Maon Kurosaki (1988–2023), a Japanese singer-songwriter

See also
Mahon (disambiguation)
Typhoon Ma-on (disambiguation)